El secreto de la solterona (also known as The Secret of the Spinster or The Secret of the Old Maid) is a 1945 Mexican mystery romantic drama film directed and co-written by Miguel M. Delgado, based on an 1868 book of the same name by E. Marlitt.

Cast
Sara García as Marta
Isabela Corona as Micaela
José Cibrián as Pedro
Rosario Granados as Felicidad 
Nelly Montiel as Celia
Paco Fuentes as Juan
Tony Díaz as Luis
Agustín Sen as Butler Enrique
Conchita Gentil Arcos as Federica
Edmundo Espino as Notary
Manuel Noriega Ruiz as Teacher 
Alicia Rodríguez as Felicidad (young)
Gloria Rodríguez as Celia (young)

External links
 

1945 films
1940s Spanish-language films
Films based on German novels
Mexican black-and-white films
Mexican romantic drama films
1945 romantic drama films
Mexican mystery films
1945 mystery films
Films directed by Miguel M. Delgado
1940s Mexican films